Zingara (Italian for Gypsy woman) is a 1969 Italian "musicarello" film directed by Mariano Laurenti. It is named after the Bobby Solo's hit song "Zingara".

Cast 

 Bobby Solo: Franco Sarresi
 Loretta Goggi: Marisa
 Pippo Franco: Orazio
 Minnie Minoprio: Silvia
 Gigi Reder: Director of the restaurant
 Claudio Gora: Camillo Ricci 
 Pino Ferrara: Augusto Ricci
 Mario Pisu: Marisa and Silvia's father
 Linda Sini: Marisa and Silvia's mother
 Umberto D'Orsi: Comm. Pergiovanni
 Nanda Primavera: Pergiovanni's wife
 Dada Gallotti: Pergiovanni's lover
 Alicia Brandet: Elizabeth McDonald 
 Fabio Testi:   "The Chinese"
 Ignazio Leone

References

External links

Zingara at Variety Distribution

1969 films
Musicarelli
1969 musical comedy films
Films directed by Mariano Laurenti
1960s Italian-language films
1960s Italian films